Playin' with My Friends: Bennett Sings the Blues is a 2001 album by Tony Bennett featuring duets with notable vocalists.

Track listing
 "Alright, Okay, You Win" (Mayme Watts, Sidney Wyche) – 3:31 (duet with Diana Krall)
 "Everyday (I Have the Blues)" (Peter Chatman) – 3:38 (duet with Stevie Wonder)
 "Don't Cry Baby" (Saul Bernie, James P. Johnson, Stella Unger) – 2:43
 "Good Morning Heartache" (Ervin Drake, Dan Fisher, Irene Higginbotham) – 4:56 (duet with Sheryl Crow)
 "Let the Good Times Roll" (Fleecie Moore, Lovin' Sam Theard) – 3:14 (duet with B.B. King)
 "Evenin'" (Mitchell Parish, Harry White) – 4:14 (duet with Ray Charles)
 "I Gotta Right to Sing the Blues" (Harold Arlen, Ted Koehler) – 3:55 (duet with Bonnie Raitt)
 "Keep the Faith, Baby" (Luchi de Jesus, Lila Lerner, Watts) – 3:51 (duet with k.d. lang)
 "Old Count Basie Is Gone (Old Piney Brown Is Gone)" (Joe Turner) – 3:24
 "Blue and Sentimental" (Count Basie, Mack David, Jerry Livingston) – 3:20 (duet with Kay Starr)
 "New York State of Mind" (Billy Joel) – 4:30 (duet with Billy Joel)
 "Undecided Blues" (Jimmy Rushing) – 3:17
 "Blues in the Night" (Arlen, Johnny Mercer) – 3:33
 "Stormy Weather" (Arlen, Koehler) – 4:34 (duet with Natalie Cole)
 "Playin' with My Friends" (Robert Cray, Dennis Walker) – 4:47

Personnel

Performers
 Tony Bennett – vocals
 Ray Charles
 Natalie Cole
 Sheryl Crow
 Billy Joel
 B.B. King
 Diana Krall
 k.d. lang
 Bonnie Raitt
 Kay Starr
 Stevie Wonder
 Harry Allen – saxophone
 Ralph Sharon – piano
 Mike Melvoin – Hammond organ
 Gray Sargent – guitar
 Paul Langosch – double bass
 Clayton Cameron – drums

Production credits
 Phil Ramone – producer
 Danny Bennett – executive producer
 Vance Anderson – production coordination
 Rob Mathes – vocal arrangements
 Charles Paakkari – engineer
 Joel Moss – engineer, mixing
 Claudius Mittendorfer – engineer, mixing assistant
 Tom Young – engineer, design, monitor engineer, studio monitor mix
 Dae Bennett – mixing
 Ted Jensen – mastering

Year-end charts

References

External links 
 

2001 albums
Tony Bennett albums
Columbia Records albums
Vocal duet albums
Albums produced by Phil Ramone
Grammy Award for Best Traditional Pop Vocal Album